Major-General Thomas Holmes Tidy (c.1808 – 1 July 1874) was a British Army officer who became General Officer Commanding Eastern District.

Early life
Thomas Tidy was the son of Colonel Francis Skelly Tidy (1775–1835). Frank Tidy was the son of Reverend Thomas Holmes Tidy (1766–), chaplain to His Majesty's 26th regiment of foot, and Henrietta Augusta Skelly (1766–). Thomas Tidy's son was British soldier, Australian jackaroo and tutor, journalist, and minister of religion Gordon Tidy (c. 1862–1953).

Military career

Tidy was commissioned as an ensign in the 14th Regiment of Foot on 14 April 1825. He became Deputy Adjutant-General in Jamaica in the late 1850s, Assistant Adjutant General at Horse Guards in the early 1860s and General Officer Commanding Eastern District in April 1866.

References

1874 deaths
British Army generals